Skal may refer to:

Exclamation 
 Skål, also skál or skoal, an exclamation in a toasting ceremony; see toast

People 
 David J. Skal (born 1952), American historian & writer
 Skal Labissière (born 1996), Haitian basketball player

See also
 Skaal (disambiguation)
 Skoal (disambiguation)
 Skol (disambiguation)
 Skoll (disambiguation)